Interpol: The Trail of Dr. Chaos is a puzzle strategy video game, developed by TikGames for the Microsoft Windows, Mac OS X, Xbox 360, and PlayStation 3.

Reception

Critical reception for Interpol: The Trail of Dr. Chaos has been negative. On Metacritic, the game holds scores of 45/100 for the Xbox 360 version based on 28 reviews, and 48/100 for the PlayStation 3 version based on 5 reviews. On GameRankings, the game holds scores of 48.85% for the Xbox 360 version based on 26 reviews, and 47.67% for the PlayStation 3 version based on 3 reviews.

IGN panned the game, writing "Interpol is good for a few short bursts of seek-and-find fun, but it's just not a game that's very well suited to the console. Add that to the poor image resolution, inconsistent puzzles and overall shaky production value, and you have a game that's probably not worth the download." ABC.com.au's Good Game Stories also panned the game.

References 

2007 video games
MacOS games
PlayStation 3 games
PlayStation Network games
Single-player video games
TikGames games
Video games about police officers
Video games developed in the United States
Video games scored by Laura Shigihara
Windows games
Xbox 360 Live Arcade games